Raphitoma pseudohystrix is a species of sea snail, a marine gastropod mollusk in the family Raphitomidae.

Description

Distribution
 European waters
 Grecian Exclusive Economic Zone
 Western, Central Mediterranean and Adriatic. The records from Greece seem due to a misidentification.

References

 Giannuzzi-Savelli R., Pusateri F. & Bartolini S., 2018. A revision of the Mediterranean Raphitomidae (Gastropoda: Conoidea) 5: loss of planktotrophy and pairs of species, with the description of four new species. Bollettino Malacologico 54, Suppl. 11: 1-77
 Ceulemans L., Van Dingenen F. & Landau B.M. (2018). The lower Pliocene gastropods of Le Pigeon Blanc (Loire- Atlantique, northwest France). Part 5 – Neogastropoda (Conoidea) and Heterobranchia (fine). Cainozoic Research. 18(2): 89-176

External links
 Sykes E. R. 1906. On the Mollusca procured during the "Porcupine" Expeditions 1869-1870. Supplemental notes, part III. Proceedings of the Malacological Society of London 7: 173-190, pl. 16
 Carrozza F. (1984). Raphitoma divae n. sp. Bollettino Malacologico 20(5-8): 151-154
 MNHN. Paris: holotype
 
 Gastropods.com: Raphitoma (Raphitoma) pseudohystrix
 Natural History Museum, Rotterdam: Raphitoma pseudohystrix

pseudohystrix
Gastropods described in 1906